Acrossocheilus kreyenbergii is a species of cyprinid fish. It is known from the Guangxi, Jiangxi, Zhejiang, and Anhui provinces in southern and eastern China. It grows to  standard length.

References

Kreyenbergii
Freshwater fish of China
Endemic fauna of China
Fish described in 1908
Taxa named by Charles Tate Regan